Lee Ann T. Bennett is a United States Air Force major general who has served as the mobilization assistant to the Deputy Chief of Staff for Intelligence, Surveillance, Reconnaissance, and Cyber Effects Operations of the United States Air Force since October 2019. Previously, she was the mobilization assistant to the Deputy Chief of Staff, Intelligence, Surveillance and Reconnaissance.

References

Living people
Place of birth missing (living people)
Recipients of the Legion of Merit
United States Air Force generals
Year of birth missing (living people)